Stanger Secondary School is a public high school located in Stanger / KwaDukuza on the north coast of Kwazulu Natal in South Africa.

History

The school was officially opened on 3 August 1920 and historically catered for the Indian community during apartheid.  The school was referred to as "Stanger State Indian High School" during the Apartheid era.

Learners

The school caters for learners from a vast range of communities.  Feeder schools are mainly Kwadukuza Primary (located directly opposite Stanger Secondary), Dawnview Primary and Ashram Primary.  About 70% of the learners come from historically disadvantaged backgrounds.
An ex-learner of notable reference is former national education minister Kader Asmal.

International Link
Since 2004 Stanger Secondary School has been part of a "twinning agreement" with two schools in the United Kingdom - Cornwallis School and Beauchamp College.  This link has yielded many benefits.  Key examples of benefits include books, computers and skills.  Internet connectivity was established in 2005 and, for the first time, an email was sent from within the school.

Fundanami Learning Centre
One of the most significant benefits Stanger Secondary has gained from the twinning agreement is the construction of a state-of-the-art Learning Centre at the heart of the school.  This centre was named "Fundanami" by the learners of the school.  "Fundanami" is an Isizulu word meaning "Learn With Me".  Construction began in May 2008 and completed in November 2008.  The Centre was officially opened on 19 March 2009 in a function graced by many local representatives in education as well as the Kwazulu Natal Minister of Education, Ina Cronje.  The Centre's first manager was Mrs E. Hendricks.
The centre aims to be a multimedia and literacy hub.  Literacy, being a major problem in the school, is tackled by means of a Reading Assistance Programme.  Since the start of 2009, reading assists were employed by the Fundanami Trust to assist Grade 8 learners who possess a very low reading age.  The learners are identified by means of a Reading Test conducted early in the academic year.  Learners who progress in their reading age are rewarded with a Participation Certificate.  The first two certificates were presented at the centre's official opening on 19 March 2009 by Mike Wood of the Fundanami Trust.
In addition to the Reading Programme, the centre is also utilized for a period called "Special English" (for Grades 8 to 12) - basically a Library Period where learners are encouraged to borrow books and read.

Participation in International Conference
One of the benefits of the twinning agreement with Cornwallis is the school's active participation in an annual international conference on student leadership.  In 2007 Mrs P. Nasaree (Head of Department - Languages) participated in the conference held in Lünen, Germany.  With her, two learners, Raihanna Suliman and Mandisa Mlambo represented South Africa.
In 2008, Mrs Nasaree together with learners Nkululeko Mzimela and Sarika Chunilal attended the conference in Leicester, England.
The October 2009 conference was held in South Africa with delegates from the United Kingdom (including one Yusuf Patel who used to live in South Africa), Germany and India participating.  In addition, delegates from several local schools participated.
The October 2010 conference was held in Germany with delegates from the United Kingdom, Germany, India, France and Sweden participating.  In addition, delegates from several local schools participated. Learners from our school who participated were Ruvarashe Ndoora, Shabana Ali, Nomathemba Madlala and Zahraa Moolla.
The 2011 International Conference was hosted by Beauchamp College in the United Kingdom in Leicester, England featuring South Africa, England and Sweden. Two learners, Vaughn Naicker and Nqobile Mchunu, had attended this conference in October 2011.  2012's participants to Sweden were Alvina Rajmoney and Mvelo Zikhali.

Staff
The current principal is Mr Bhekisisa A Mhlongo (appointed May 2020). The deputy principal is Mrs P Nasaree.
The school is manned by a staff of approximately 40 educators.
The school is additionally managed by a team of Head of Departments, who also manages a specific grade.

School Management
The school follows a 5-day cycled Time Table.  There are six 55-minute periods in each school day.
The school is arranged with Teacher-Based Specialist Rooms.  Hence learners move from class-to-class depending on the Time Table.  This method is preferred as the subject teacher can host a range of equipment and learning aids in their Specialist Room - thus benefiting the learner.  The movement is kept to minimal, however, by careful allocation of Specialised Rooms.

Learners are expected to wear a specialised uniform.  Boys wear a grey trousers, white shirt and school tie (blue, with white stripes).  Girls wear a check blue and white dress.  As of early 2014, the school introduced golf-shirts for the boys.

Due to Stanger Secondary's proximity to a tarred road and the fact that it has electricity and running water, it is classed a Quintile 4 fee-charging school.  School fees in 2020 was set at ZAR1750-00, for 2021 it was set to ZAR1950 and currently 2022 it is set to ZAR2500.  Learners from disadvantaged backgrounds may apply for a concession or exemption for school fees.

Curriculum
The school covers a vast range of Learning Areas.  All lessons are conducted in English.  (Except for lessons in the Additional Languages.)

Grades 8 and 9 cover the standard GET phase subjects:

LLC English

LLC Afrikaans or Isizulu

Mathematics

Natural Sciences (Combined Physical Science and Life Science)

Social Sciences (Combined Geography and History)

Life Orientation

Creative Arts

Economic and Management Sciences (Combined Accounting and Business Studies)

Technology

In addition, Grades 8's and 9's are trained with basic computer skills in a non-examined subject called Computer Literacy.

Grades 10, 11, 12 cover standard CAPS subjects ranging from sciences (Physics, Life Sciences) to vocational subjects like Tourism and Consumer Studies.

In 2013, the school has re-introduced Information Technology into its curriculum.

English, Afrikaans OR Isizulu, Life Orientation and Mathematics OR Mathematical Literacy are compulsory.
The learner chooses three elective subjects.

The school's many decades have produced a high number of professionals in society.  Learners are guided on Course Selection right from Grade 9 when crucial decisions are made.

External links
 Stanger Secondary on Wikimapia
 School Song "Semper Sursum"
 Beauchamp College Newsletter detailing link with Stanger Secondary
 Cornwallis School Newsletter detailing link with Stanger Secondary
 Stanger Secondary School's official Facebook Page
 Stanger Secondary Photo Page at Picasa
 Stanger Secondary Photo Page at Flickr
 Website of the Fundanami Learning Centre project

Schools in KwaZulu-Natal
High schools in South Africa